The Siege of Corinth can mean:

 Le siège de Corinthe, an opera by Gioachino Rossini 
 The Siege of Corinth (poem), a narrative poem by Lord Byron